The  Tom Barnes Barn is a historic barn located on State Highway 25 approximately  east of Jerome, Idaho. Farmer Tom Barns began construction of the barn in 1929; in 1930, stonemason Pete Duffy finished the building. The barn features an arched rainbow roof and a lava rock foundation; the roof style is considered unusual for barns in the region.

The barn was added to the National Register of Historic Places on September 8, 1983.

References

See also

 List of National Historic Landmarks in Idaho
 National Register of Historic Places listings in Jerome County, Idaho

Barns on the National Register of Historic Places in Idaho
Buildings and structures completed in 1930
Buildings and structures in Jerome County, Idaho
1930 establishments in Idaho
National Register of Historic Places in Jerome County, Idaho